Winsome Joan Evans OAM BEM (born 26 October 1941), is one of Australia's premier early music specialists.

Biography
She received a Bachelor of Music (Honours) degree in composition from the University of Sydney, where her lecturers included Peter Sculthorpe. In addition to her activities as a professional harpsichordist, composer, and arranger, she is perhaps best known for her role as director of the Renaissance Players, one of Australia's best known early music ensembles.  She was until recently an Associate Professor of music at the University of Sydney.

Evans has "re-composed" all of Johann Sebastian Bach's works for solo violin as works for clavicembalo, adding accompaniments as she believes Bach must have had in mind.  Her recording of her recomposition of the 6 Sonatas and Partitas, BWV 1001–1006, was released in 2009.

Awards and honours
In 1980, she was awarded the British Empire Medal (BEM) in the Queen's Birthday Honours List and the NSW Jaycees' Award for services to music.  In 1986 she was awarded the Medal of the Order of Australia (OAM) for services to music.

She was featured, along with her colleague Australian composer and music professor Anne Boyd, in the documentary Facing the Music.

She uses the name Snave Pluckpayres in some contexts.

References

Sources
 Sydney Morning Herald article
 Record company biography
 Sydney University biography

1941 births
Living people
Australian musicologists
Women musicologists
Academic staff of the University of Sydney
Australian harpsichordists
Australian women composers
Australian composers
Australian performers of early music
Women performers of early music
Australian recipients of the British Empire Medal
Recipients of the Medal of the Order of Australia